The 1917 Cornell Big Red football team was an American football team that represented Cornell University as an independent during the 1917 college football season. In their sixth season under head coach Albert Sharpe, the Big Red compiled a 3–6 record and were outscored by their opponents by a combined total of 146 to 78.

Schedule

References

Cornell
Cornell Big Red football seasons
Cornell Big Red football